The Alton Junction, more commonly known as the 21st Street Crossing, is a historically significant rail location in Chicago, Illinois. The junction can be found just east of Canal Street and north of Cermak Road near Chicago's Chinatown. It is located just south of a massive vertical lift bridge that spans the South Branch of the Chicago River and "guards" the entrance to Chicago's Union Station. While a significant amount of rail traffic still traverses this interlock every day, it has been greatly reduced from using 26 diamonds to control over 150 trains using the crossing.

The north-south line is the former Pennsylvania Railroad (Pittsburgh, Fort Wayne & Chicago) mainline, which is now owned and operated by Amtrak as the southern gateway to the Union Station complex. The Norfolk Southern's Chicago Line and the former BNSF Southern Transcon terminate at the southern entrance to the interlocking, but both NS and Burlington Northern Santa Fe trains have trackage rights over the bridge to access the BNSF east-west main line.  All of Amtrak's East Coast bound and Michigan trains use this track. The east-west line now belongs to the Canadian National Railway. It at one time was owned by Illinois Central and was the carrier's route out of its Central Station to Iowa.

Alton Junction was controlled by a manned interlocking tower until 2005 when Amtrak transferred control to its new Chicago Terminal control center.  Known as 21st Street tower, its operators handled movements through the busy plant using a US&S Model 14 electro-pneumatic interlocking machine.  In its final years 21st St took remote control of the closed  NYC Clark St tower on the joint NYC/CRI&P tracks at 16th St

Notes

Transportation in Chicago
Rail junctions in the United States